The Łódź metropolitan area (known in Polish as: Łódźki Obszar Metropolitalny) is the metropolitan area of Łódź. The metropolitan area covers ten counties in the Łódź Voivodeship, with an area of 2,496 km2.

The largest cities or towns within the metropolitan area are Łódź, Pabianice, Zgierz and Aleksandrów Łódzki.

Economy 
In 2020 Łódź's gross metropolitan product was €16.8 billion. This puts Łódź in 150th place among cities in European Union.

See also 
 Metropolitan areas in Poland

References 

Metropolitan areas of Poland